Kerala architecture is a style of architecture found mostly in the Indian state of Kerala and in parts of Tulu Nadu region of Karnataka. Kerala's style of architecture is a unique Hindu temple architecture that emerged in the southwest part of India, in slight contrast to Dravidian architecture practised in other parts of southern India. The architecture of Kerala has been derived mostly from Indian Vedic architectural tradition and forms a part of the Dravidian architecture, one of the three styles of temples mentioned in the ancient books on Vastu Shastra. The Tantrasamuchaya, Thachu-Shastra, Manushyalaya Chandrika, and Silparatna are architectural treatises which have had an impact on architecture of Kerala . The Manushyalaya-Chandrika, a work devoted to domestic architecture, has its roots in Kerala.

Origins 
The characteristic regional expression of Kerala architecture results from the geographical, climatic and historic factors. Geographically Kerala is a narrow strip of land lying in between  seaboard of peninsular India and confined between the towering Western Ghats on its east and the vast Arabian sea on its west. Due to Monsoon rains and a high average temperature Kerala has lots of wildlife and vegetation. In the uneven terrain of this region human habitation is distributed thickly in the fertile low-lands and sparsely towards the hostile highlands. Heavy rains have brought in presence of large water bodies in form of lakes, rivers, backwaters and lagoons. The climatic factors has had significant contributions in developing the architecture style, to counter wettest climatic conditions coupled with heavy humidity and harsh tropical summers.

History also played its own contributions to the Kerala architecture. The towering Western Ghats on its east, has successfully prevented influences of neighboring Tamil countries into present day Kerala in later times. While Western Ghats isolated Kerala to a greater extent from Indian empires, the exposure of Arabian sea on its east brought in close contacts between the ancient people of Kerala with major maritime civilizations like Egyptians, Romans, Arabs etc. The Kerala's rich spice cultivations brought it center of global maritime trade until modern periods, helping several international powers to actively engage with Kerala as a trading partners. This helped in bring in influences of these civilisations into Kerala architecture.

History

Pre-historic era 
The locational feature of Kerala has influenced the social development and indirectly the style of construction. In the ancient times the Arabian sea and the Ghats formed impenetrable barriers helping the evolution of an isolated culture of Proto-Dravidians, contemporary to the Harappan civilisation. The earliest vestiges of constructions in Kerala belong to this period dated between 3000 B.C. to 300 B.C. They can be grouped into two types – tomb cells and megaliths. The rock cut tomb cells are generally located in the laterite zones of central Kerala, for example at Porkalam, Thrissur district. The tombs are roughly oblong in plan with single or multiple bed chambers with a rectangular court in the east from where steps rise to the ground level. Another type of burial chamber is made of four slabs placed on edges and a fifth one covering them as a cap stone. One or more such dolmens are marked by a stone circle. Among the megaliths are the umbrella stones ("kudakkal"), resembling handless palm leaf umbrellas used for covering pits enclosing burial urns. Two other types of megaliths, hat stones ("thoppikkal") and menhirs ("pulachikkal") however have no burial appendages. They appear to be rather memorial stones.

The megaliths are not of much architectural significance, but they speak of the custom of the primitive tribes erecting memorials at sites of mortuary rites. These places later became the annual meeting grounds of the tribes and gave rise to occult temples of ancestral worship. While the custom of father worship can be seen in these cases, the protecting deities of the villages were always in female form, who were worshiped in open groves ("kavu"). These hypaethral temples had trees, stone symbols of Mother Goddesses or other naturalistic or animistic image as objects of worship. The continuity of this early culture is seen in the folk arts, cult rituals, worship of trees, serpents and mother images in kavus.

Hindu/Kerala Architecture, Architecture in Buddhism 

Dravidian Architecture

The version of Dravidian architecture found in Kerala in the far south-west is significantly different. Very large temples are rare, and sloping roofs with projecting eaves dominate the outline, often arranged in a number of tiers. As in Bengal, this is an adaption to the heavy monsoon rainfall. There is usually a stone core below a timber superstructure.

The Jain monuments are more numerous in Kerala. They include rock shelters at Chitral Jain cave near Nagercoil, a rock cut temple at Kallil near Perumbavoor, and remains of structural temples at Alathoor near Palakkad and at Sultanbathery. Jainimedu Jain temple is a 15th-century Jain temple located at Jainimedu, 3 km from the centre of Palakkad. Sculptured Kerala Jaina and Dravidian figures of Mahavira, Parswanatha and other thirthankaras have been recovered from these sites. This remained a Jain temple until 1522CE before being consecrated as a Hindu temple. Sultanbathery also has the remains of a Jaina basti, known as Ganapati vattam, being an example of a cloistered temple built entirely of granite.

Thorana is a gateway provided in the palisade seen in the vertical and horizontal members of the vilakkumadam. In its most primitive form this construction is seen in the hypaethral temples enshrining trees and later on the outer walls of the shrines proper. With the stylistic development of the Hindu temple this form of palisade is removed from the shrine structure (srikovil) and taken as a separate edifice beyond the temple cloister (chuttambalam).

Hinduism was co-existent with the indigenous Dravidian cultural and social practices of Kerala. Early Tamil Sangam literature says that by the First century A.D. the Cheras all of present-day Kerala, parts of Tulunadu and Kodagu, and the Kongu lands (present Salem and Coimbatore region). It had multiple capitals simultaneously administered by different lineages of the Family, its main capital being Vanchi, identified with the Thiruvanchikulam near Kodungallur. At this time, the two extremities of the Kerala region were administered by two Velir families. The southernmost part administered by the Ay chieftains of Thiruvananthapuram and the northernmost parts by the Nannans of Ezhilmalai. The Nannan line was a branch of the Ay originating in the Thiruvananthapuram area and both were representatives (or vassals) under the suzerainty of the Cheras (and sometimes the Pandyas or Cholas or Pallavas).

The amalgamation of different cultures and religious philosophies helped to evolve the architectural styles of Kerala temples.  This was highly conducive of architectural development and renovation of a large number of temples. After the decline of the Cheras several small principalities developed all over Kerala. By fifteenth century, Kerala was broadly covered by the suzerainty of four principal chieftains – Venad rulers in the south, Kochi Maharajas in the centre, Zamorins of Kozhikode in the north and Kolathiri Rajas in the extreme north. They were rulers who patronised architectural activities. It was this period, Kerala Architecture started shaping its own distinctive style. A regional character in construction incorporating the Dravidian craft skills, unique forms of Buddhist buildings, design concepts of vedic times and canonical theories of Hindu Agamic practices in locally available materials and suited to the climatic conditions was finally evolved in Kerala. The theory and practice of architectural construction were also compiled during this period.

Their compilations remain as classical texts of a living tradition to this day. Four important books in this area are;

 Thantrasamuchayam (Chennas Narayanan Namboodiri) and Silpiratnam (Sreekumara), covering temple architecture
 Vastuvidya (anon.) and Manushyalaya Chandrika (Thirumangalathu Sri Neelakandan), dealing with the domestic architecture. A number of minor works in Sanskrit, Manipravalam and refined Malayalam, all based on the above texts have found popularity in Kerala with the craftsmen and professionals related with the subject.

Kerala is referred as one of the border kingdoms of the Maurya empire. It is possible that Buddhists and Jainas were the first north Indian groups to cross the borders of Kerala and establish their monasteries. These religious groups were able to practise their faith and receive patronage from the local kings to build shrines and viharas. For nearly eight centuries Buddhism and Jainism seem to have co-existed in Kerala as an important faith, contributing in its own way to the social and architectural development of the region.

Composition and structure 

Kerala architecture can be broadly divided into two distinctive areas based on their functionality, each guided by different set of principles:
 Religious Architecture, primarily patronised by temples of Kerala as well as several old churches, mosques etc.
 Domestic Architecture, primarily seen in most of the residential houses. There are distinctively styles in this area, as Palaces and large mansions of feudal lords different from houses of commoners and also marked difference exists between religious communities.

Composition 

The primary elements of all structures tends to remain same. The base model is normally circular, square or rectangular plain shapes with a ribbed roof evolved from functional consideration. The most distinctive visual form of Kerala architecture is the long, steep sloping roof built to protect the house's walls and to withstand the heavy monsoon, normally laid with tiles or thatched labyrinth of palm leaves, supported on a roof frame made of hard wood and timber. Structurally the roof frame was supported on the pillars on walls erected on a plinth raised from the ground for protection against dampness and insects in the tropical climate. Often the walls were also of timbers abundantly available in Kerala. Dormer windows were evolved at the two ends to provide attic ventilation when ceiling was incorporated for the room spaces.

The belief system of Vastu plays a very important role in developing architecture styles. The basic underlying belief is that, every structure built on earth has its own life, with a soul and personality which is shaped by its surroundings. The most important science which has Kerala has developed purely indigenously is Thachu-Shastra (Science of Carpentry) as the easily availability of timber and its heavy use of it. The concept of Thachu underlines that as timber is derived from a living form, the wood, when used for construction, has its own life which must be synthesised in harmony with its surroundings and people whom dwell inside it.
That's the story of Kochi'c construction.

Materials 
The natural building materials available for construction in Kerala are stones, timber, clay and palm leaves. Granite is a strong and durable building stone; however its availability is restricted mostly to the highlands and only marginally to other zones. Owing to this, the skill in quarrying, dressing and sculpturing of stone is scarce in Kerala. Laterite on the other hand is the most abundant stone found as outcrops in most zones. Soft laterite available at shallow depth can be easily cut, dressed and used as building blocks. It is a rare local stone which gets stronger and durable with exposure at atmospheric air. Laterite blocks may be bonded in mortars of shell lime, which have been the classic binding material used in traditional buildings. Lime mortar can be improved in strength and performance by admixtures of vegetable juices. Such enriched mortars were used for plastering or for serving as the base for mural painting and low relief work. Timber is the prime structural material abundantly available in many varieties in Kerala – from bamboo to teak. Perhaps the skilful choice of timber, accurate joinery, artful assembly and delicate carving of wood work for columns, walls and roofs frames are the unique characteristics of Kerala architecture. Clay was used in many forms – for walling, in filling the timber floors and making bricks and tiles after pugging and tempering with admixtures. Palm leaves were used effectively for thatching the roofs and for making partition walls.

From the limitations of the materials, a mixed mode of construction was evolved in Kerala architecture. The stone work was restricted to the plinth even in important buildings such as temples. Laterite was used for walls. The roof structure in timber was covered with palm leaf thatching for most buildings and rarely with tiles for palaces or temples. The exterior of the laterite walls were either left as such or plastered with lime mortar to serve as the base for mural painting. The sculpturing of the stone was mainly moulding in horizontal bands in the plinth portion (adhistans) whereas the carving of timber covered all elements _ pillars, beams, ceiling, rafters and the supporting brackets. The Kerala murals are paintings with vegetable dyes on wet walls in subdued shades of brown. The indigenous adoption of the available raw materials and their transformation as enduring media for architectural expression thus became the dominant feature of the Kerala style.

Structure

Religious architecture

Temple architecture 

The variety of temples, numbering more than 2000 dotting the Kerala state has no match with any other regions of India. The temples of Kerala highly developed in strict accordance to two temple construction thesis, Thantra-Samuchayam and Shilparatnam. While the former deals in developing structures that regulates energy flows so that positive energy flows in, while negative energy do not trend to remain retarded within the structure; whereas the latter deals in developing stone and timber architecture in such manner that each carved structure imbibe a life and personality of its own.

Elements and features of Kerala Temple 

 Shree-Kovil

 
The inner sanctum sanctorum where the idol of the presiding deity is installed and worshiped. It shall be an independent structure, detached from other buildings with no connections, and having its own roof shared with none. The Sri-kovil does not have any windows and has only one large door opening mostly towards the east (sometimes it happens towards the west, whereas a few temples have a north-facing door as its specialty, while no temples will have a south-facing door).

The Shreekovil may be built in different plan shapes – square, rectangular, circular, or apsidal. Of these, the square plan shows an even distribution throughout Kerala. The square shape is basically the form of the Vedic fire altar and strongly suggest the Vedic mooring. It is categorized as the nagara style of the temple in the architectural texts. The rectangular plan is favored for the Ananthasai Vishnu (Lord Vishnu in reclining posture) and the Sapta matrikas (Seven Mother Goddesses). The circular plan and the apsidal plan are rare in other parts of India and unknown even in the civil architecture of Kerala, but they constitute an important group of temples. The circular plan shows a greater preponderance in the southern part of Kerala, in regions once under the influence of Buddhism. The apsidal plan is a combination of the semi-circle and the square and it is seen distributed sporadically all over the coastal region. The circular temples belong to the Vasara category. A variation of circle-ellipse is also seen as an exception in the Siva shrine at Vaikkom. Polygonal shapes belonging to the Dravida category are also adopted rarely in temple plans but they find use as a feature of shikhara. As per the Thantrasamuchayam, every Sreekovil should be built either neutral or even-sided.

For the unitary temples, the overall height is taken as 13/7/ to 2 1/8 of the width of the shrine, and categorized into 5 classes as i.e.; santhika, purshtika, yayada, achudha, and savakamika – with increasing height of the temple form. The total height is basically divided into two halves. The lower half consists of the basement, the pillar or the wall (stambha or bhithi), and the entablature (prasthara) in the ratio 1:2:1, in height. Similarly, the upper half is divided into the neck (griva), the roof tower (shikhara), and the finial (Kalasham) in the same ratio. The adhisthana or foundation is generally in granite but the superstructure is built in laterite. The roofings will be of normally taller than other temple structures.  The structural roof of the shrine is constructed as the corbelled dome of masonry; however in order to protect it from the vagaries of climate it was superposed by a functional roof, made of timber frame covered by planks and tiles. This sloping roof with its projecting caves gave the characteristic form to the Kerala temple. The finial or Kalasham, made of copper, provided the crowning spire denoting the focus of the shrine wherein the idol was installed.

Normally the Shreekovil is on a raised platform and has a flight or 3 or 5 steps to be. The steps are called Sopanapadi and on sides of the Sopanapadi, two large statues known as Dwarapalakas (door guards) are craved to guard the deity. As per Kerala rituals style, only main priest (Thantri) and second priest (Melshanti) only allowed to enter into Sri-kovil.

 Namaskara Mandapam

The namaskara mandapa is a square shaped pavilion with a raised platform, a set of pillars and a pyramidal roof. The size of the mandapa is decided by the width of the shrine cell. The pavilion in its simplest form has four corner pillars; but larger pavilions are provided with two sets of pillars; four inside and twelve outside. Pavilions of circular, elliptical and polygonal shapes are mentioned in the texts, but they are not seen in Kerala temples. The Mandapams are used to conducting Vedic-Thantric rites.

 Nalambalam

 
The shrine and the mandapa building are enclosed in a rectangular structure called the nalambalam. Functionally the rear and side halls of the nalambalam serves for various activities related to the ritualistic worship. The front hall is pierced with the entry, dividing it into two parts. These two halls; Agrasalas which used for feeding Brahmans, performing yagas and while Koothuambalam are used for staging temple arts such as koothu and temple murals. In few cases, Koothuambalams are separated as an individual structure outside Nalambalam.

 Balithara

 
At the entrance of Nalambalam, a square shaped raised stone altar called as Balithara can be seen. This altar is used to make ritualistic offerings to demi-gods and other spirits. Inside the Nalambalam, several small stones, called Balikallukal can be seen, meant for same purpose.

  Chuttambalam

The outer structure within the temple walls, is known as Chuttambalam. Normally Chuttuambalam has main pavilion known as Mukha-Mandapam or Thala-mandapam. The Mukha-Mandapam will have the Dwajastambam (Sacred Flag-post) in center of it and has several pillars supporting mandapam. The temple is now fully enclosed in a massive wall (Kshetra-Madillukal) pierced with gate houses or gopurams. The gopuram is usually two-storeyed, which served two purposes. The ground floor was an open space generally used as a platform for temple dances such as kurathy dance or ottan thullal during festivals. The upper floor with wooden trails covering the sides functioned as a kottupura _ (a hall for drums beating). The Chuttuambalam will normally has 4 gates from outside to entrance at all sides. A stone paved walk-way will be seen around the Chuttambalam to allow devotees circulate around the temple, which for some large temples are covered with roof supported with massive pillars on both sides. The Chuttuambalam will have Dwajavillakku or giant lamp-posts in several places, mostly in Mukha-mandapams.

 Ambala-Kulam

Every temple will have a sacred temple pond or water lake located within temple complex. As per Vastu-rules, water is considered as source of positive energy and synthesis balance of all energies. Hence a temple pond or Ambala Kulam will be made available within the temple complex. The temple pond is normally used only by priests as holy bath before start of rituals as well as for various sacred rituals within the temple. In few cases, a separate pond will be constructed to allow devotees to bath before entering in temple. Today several temples have Mani-Kenar or Holy Well within the Nalambalam complex to get sacred waters for purposes of Abisekham.

 Thevarapura

Normally within Nalambalam, a separate complex will be constructed for cooking foods meant to serve for the deity and distribution among devotees as holy prasadam. Such complexes are called Thevarapura, where the holy fire or Agni is invoked.

Phases of evolution 

In its stylistic development, the temple architecture can be divided into three phases.

The first phase is that of rock-cut temples. This earliest form is contemporary to Buddhist cave temples. Rock-cut temples are mainly located in southern Kerala—at Vizhinjam and Ayirurpara near Tiruvananthapuram, Kottukal near Kollam and Kaviyoor near Alappuzha. Of these the one at Kaviyoor is the best example. The Kaviyoor cave temple dedicated to Siva comprises a shrine room and a spacious ardhamandapa arranged axially facing the west. On the pillared facade as well as on the walls inside the ardhamandapa are sculptured reliefs of the donor, a bearded rishi, a seated four armed Ganesh and dwarapalas. The other cave temples also have this general pattern of a shrine and an ante-room and they are associated with Siva worship. In the north similar rock-cut temples of saiva cult are seen at Trikkur and Irunilamkode in Thrissur district. Historically the cave architecture in India begins with Buddhism and the technique of rock-cut architecture in Kerala seems to be a continuation of similar works in Tamil Nadu under the Pandyas. The rock-cut temples are all dated prior to the eighth century A.D.

The structural temples appear in the second phase spanning the eighth to tenth centuries, and patronised by the Chera, Ay and Mushika chieftains. The earliest temples had a unitary shrine or a srikovil. In rare cases a porch or ardhamandapa is seen attached to the shrine. A detached namaskara mandapa is generally built in front of the srikovil. A quadrangular building, nalambalam that encloses the srikovil, the namaskara mandapa, balikkal (altar stones) etc. became part of this basic plan composition of the Kerala temple started emerging in this phase.

The middle phase of the evolution of the temples is characterised by the emergence of the Sandhara shrine. In the unitary shrine of the earlier type, Nirendhara (single level of srikovil), there is a cell with a single doorway to the cell. But in the Sandhara shrine the cell has twin wells leaving a passage in between them. Also there are often four functional doors on all the four cardinal directions and pierced windows to provide subdued light in the passage. Sometimes the functional door on the sides and the rear are replaced by pseudo doors.

The concept of the storeyed temple is also seen in this phase. The tower of the shrine rises to the second storey with a separate upper roof forming a dwitala (two-storied) temple. There is a unique example of thrithala (three-storeyed temple) is at Shiva shrine at Peruvanam with lower two storeys of square plan and the third storey of octagonal form.

In the last phase, (1300–1800 A.D.) the stylistic development reached its apogee with greater complexity in the temple layout and elaboration of detail. The vilakkumadam, the palisade structure fixed with rows of oil lamps is added beyond the nalambalam as an outer ring. The Altar stone is also housed in a pillared structure, the Balikkal mandapam in front of the agrasala (valiyambalam). A deepastambham and dwajasthambham (the lamp post and flag mast) are added in front of the balikkal mandapam.

Within the prakara but beyond the vilakkumadam, stood the secondary shrines of parivara devathas (sub-gods) in their assigned positions. These were unitary cells, in general, though in a few cases each became a full-fledged shrine as in the case of Krishna shrine in the Siva temple at Tali, Kozhikode. The last phase culminated in the concept of the composite shrines. Herein two or three shrines of equal importance are seen cloistered inside a common nalambalam. The typical example of this is the Vadakkumnatha temple at Thrissur, where in three shrines dedicated to Siva, Rama and Sankaranarayana are located inside the nalambalam. The prakara may also contain temple tanks, vedapadhasalas and dining halls. Paradoxically some shrines have not a single secondary shrine, the unique example being the Bharatha shrine at Irinjalakuda.

A significant feature of big temple complexes is the presence of a theatre hall known as Koothambalam, meant for dance, musical performance and religious recitals. This is a unique edifice of Kerala architecture, distinct from the natyasabha or natyamandir seen in north Indian temples of this period. Koothambalam is a large pillared hall with a high roof. Inside the hall is a stage structure called as Rangamandapam for the performances. The stage as well as the pillars are ornately decorated. Visual and acoustic considerations are incorporated in the layout of the pillars and construction details so that the performances can be enjoyed by the spectators without discomfort and distortion. The Koothambalam design seems to have been based on the canons given in the Natyasastra of Bharata Muni.

In the southernmost Kerala, the temple architecture was also influenced by the developments in Tamil Nadu. At Sucheendram and Tiruvananthapuram this influence is clearly seen. Herein lofty enclosures, sculptured corridors and ornate mandapas all in granite stone practically conceal the view of the original main shrine in typical Kerala style. The entrance tower, Gopuram also rises to lofty heights in a style distinct from that of the humble two-storeyed structure seen elsewhere.

Technically the most important feature of the temple architecture of Kerala is the construction technique using a dimensional standardisation. The nucleus of the temple plan is the shrine containing the garbhagriha cell. The width of this cell is the basic module of the dimensional system. In plan composition, the width of the shrine, the open space around it, the position and sizes of the surrounding structures, are all related to the standard module. In vertical composition, this dimensional co-ordination is carried right up to the minute construction details such as the size of the pillars, wall plates, rafters etc. The canonical rules of the proportionate system are given in the treatises and preserved by the skilled craftsmen. This proportionate system has ensured uniformity in architectural style irrespective of the geographical distribution and scale of construction.

Temple architecture is a synthesis of engineering and decorative arts. The decorative elements of the Kerala temples are of three types – mouldings, sculptures and painting. The moulding is typically seen in the plinth where in horizontal hands of circular and rectangular projections and recesses in varying proportions help to emphasize the form of the adhisthana. Occasionally this plinth is raised over a secondary platform – upapeedam – with similar treatment. Mouldings are also seen in the mandapam, the hand rails of the steps (sopanam) and even in the drain channel (pranala) or the shrine cell.

The sculptural work is of two types. One category is the low relief done on the outer walls of the shrine with masonry set in lime mortar and finished with plaster and painting. The second is the sculpturing of the timber elements – the rafter ends, the brackets, the timber columns and their capitals, door frames, wall plates and beams. Decorative sculptural work is seen best in the ceiling panels of the mandapas. Exquisite lacquer work in brick red and black colour was adopted for turned columns of timber. Metal craft was also used in sculpturing idols, motifs, cladding and finials. All sculptural works were done strictly according to the canons of proportions (ashtathala, navathala and dasathala system) applicable to different figures of men, gods and goddesses, prescribed in texts.

The painting was executed in organic pigments on walls when the plaster was still wet – in soft subdued colours, making them into a class designated as Kerala murals. The theme of these paintings is invariably mythological and the epic stories unfold as one circumambulates around the temple. The moulding, sculpture and painting are also taken in vertical compositions to emphasise the different storey heights, projecting dormer windows which break the sloping roof and the crowning finial. But in all cases the decoration is secondary to the structural form. The sculptured walls are protected by the projecting caves which keep them in shade in sharp contrast with the bright sunlit exterior. This helps to impart the overall perceptual experience of light and shade revealing details only gradually to a keen observer.

Islamic architecture 

The Arabian Peninsula, the cradle of Islam also had direct trade contact with Kerala coast from very early times, as far as the time of Muhammad or even before. As local Muslim legends and tradition goes, a Chera King embraced Islam and made a voyage to Mecca. In his return trip accompanied by many Islamic religious leaders including Malik ibn Dinar, he fell sick and died. But he had given introductory letters for the party to proceed to Kodungallur. The visitors came to the port and handed over the letter to the reigning King who treated the guests with all respect and extended facilities to establish their faith in the land. The king arranged for the artisans to build the first mosque at Kodungallur near the port and ear-marked the area around it for their settlement. The original mosque has undergone extensive repairs, but the traces of the original construction are seen in the plinth, the columns and the roof which are in the old traditional styles of Hindu temples.

Undoubtedly Islam spread in Kerala through the migration of new groups from Arabian Peninsula and the gradual conversion of native population in the permissive and all accommodating Indian cultural ethos and social set up of Kerala. By twelfth century AD there were at least ten major settlements of Muslims distributed from Kollam in the south to Mangalore in the north each centered on the mosque. Also a branch of the ruling kingdom at Arakkal, Kannur was converted to Islam. The primacy in trade, the spread of the faith and the experience of the sea made Muslims a prominent class and dear to the rulers, especially of the Kozhikode Zamorins. Consequently, by fifteenth century Islamic constructions reached considerable heights.

The mosque architecture of Kerala exhibits none of the features of the Arabic style nor those of the Indo-Islamic architectures of the imperial or provincial school in north India. The reason for this is not far to seek. The work of mosque construction was done by the local Hindu artisans under instructions of the Muslim religious heads who wanted to erect the places of worship. The models for places of worship were only Hindu temples or the theatre halls ("koothambalam") and these models are to be adapted for the new situations. The early mosques in Kerala consequently resemble the traditional building of the region. Arabic style of architecture was introduced to the Malabar area of present-day Kerala, during the period of occupation by Hyder Ali and later by Tipu Sultan during the eighteenth century. A large number of temples were converted to mosques during this period as evidenced by the traditional Kerala style of these structures.

In plan the mosque comprises a large prayer hall with a mihrab on the western wall (since Mecca is west to Kerala) and covered verandah all around. Generally it has a tall basement similar to the adhistana of the Brahmanical temple and often the columns are treated with square and octagonal section as in mandapa pillars. The walls are made of laterite blocks. The arch form is seen only in one exceptional case for the mosque at Ponnani and nowhere else in the early ten mosques of the land. Wood was used extensively in superstructure for the construction of ceiling and roof. The roof in many cases is covered with sheets of copper incorporating finials in the ridge, completing the form of temple shikhara with the stupi. At Tanur the Jama Masjid even has a gate built in the manner of temple gopuram, covered with copper sheeting. This mosque itself is a three-storeyed building with tiled roof crowned by five finials.

The pulpit in the mosque present the best example of wood carvings associated with Islamic architecture of Kerala. The Jama Masjid at Beypore and Mithqal Mosque at Kozhikode have the pulpit (mimbar) built by the ship masters of the Arab vessels.

All other construction work was done by the same local craftsmen who were building the Hindu temples and residences. The Arabic tradition of simplicity of plan had perhaps combined itself with the indigenous construction techniques giving rise to the unique style of mosque architecture, not found anywhere else in the world. In contrast the Indo-Islamic architecture drew its inspiration from the Turkish and Persian traditions and created highly ornamental style in the north India. The typical Kerala mosques are seen at Kollampalli, near Kollam, Panthalayani near Koyilandy, Kozhikode, Tanur, Ponnani and Kasargode as well as in most old Muslim settlements. The austere architectural features of the old mosques are however in the process of being replaced in recent times by Islamic architecture. The use of arcuated forms, domes and minar-minarets of the imperial school of Indo-Islamic architecture are being projected as the visible symbols of Islamic culture. The Jama Masjid at Palayam, Thiruvananthapuram is the classic example of this new trend. Similar structures are coming up all over Kerala in the modification of old mosques during the last decades.

Perhaps the influence of Arabic style of Kerala construction is seen in a subtle manner in the secular architecture of Muslims. The bazar streets lined by buildings on both sides, the upper floor living rooms with view windows to the streets, the wooden screens used to provide privacy and shade in the verandahs (specially of upper floors) etc., are a few features superposed on the traditional construction. These built forms would have been modelled in the pattern of the houses in Arab countries (such as Egypt, Basra (present day Iraq) and Iran) having contact with this region. This trend is most conspicuous in market towns such as Kozhikode, Thalassery, Kasaragode etc. But basically the Muslim domestic architectures at large follow the traditional Hindu styles. Both "ekasalas" and "nālukettus" are seen adopted for this. These buildings with extensive alindams and verandahs are also seen generally surrounding the mosques in Muslim settlements.

Church architecture 

The evolution of the church architecture of Kerala springs from two sources – the first from the work of Apostle St. Thomas and the Syrian Christians and second from the missionary work of European settlers. The tradition has it that St. Thomas who landed in Muziris in 52 AD had seven churches built in Kerala at Kodungallur, Chayil, Palur, Paravur-Kottakkavu, Kollam, Niranom and Kothamangalam, but none of these Syrian churches are now extant. It is possible that some of the temples were adapted as Syrian churches for services by the population who got converted into Syriac Christianity by St. Thomas. For example, the present Palur Syrian church has preserved the abhisheka patra (the letter of intonation) and certain shaiva symbols as the relics of the old church which is said to have been a Hindu shrine adapted for Christian worship.

Historical evidences suggest that the first wave of Christianity came from Edessa, Persia in the fourth century A.D. owing to the persecution of Syrian Christians in the Persian empire. According to the narration of Byzantine monk Cosmas, Kerala had many churches by sixth century A.D. According to the inscription of the times of Stanu Ravi by ninth century, Syrian Christian communities enjoyed many rights and privileges. They also played a vital role in trade and commerce. The domestic buildings of the Syrian Christians were akin to the native architecture.

However, original Syrians who had migrated to Kerala had brought with them some of the West Asian conventions in church architecture. Consequently, churches with regular chancel and nave began to be built and there evolved a distinctive style of church architecture. The peculiar feature of this style was the ornamental gable facade at the nave end, surmounted by a cross. An entry porch (shala) in front of the nave was another feature of these early shrines. The baptistry was a small chamber inside the nave near the entrance. Belfries were built on one side of the nave, but in smaller churches the bell was hung in an opening in the nave gable.

Elements of Kerala church architecture 

Unlike Kerala temples, there is no uniform or standard layout for all churches of Kerala. Rather most of churches have different set to architecture according to various sects and their traditions apart from experimentation of new designs. Still most of churches, particularly Saint Thomas Christian churches of Kerala, do share several common features.

The church had a gable roof extending to the chancel, the most sacred part of the church and the sacristy by its side. The tower over the chancel soared higher than the roof of the nave similar to the shikhara over the garbhagriha in a Hindu temple. The residence of the priest and the parish hall were located on one side of the church and the cemetery was on the other side.

In their external feature Syrian churches retained some of the indigenous features of the Hindu style. The church and the ancillary buildings were enclosed in a massive laterite wall.

There was an open cross in front of the main entrance on a granite basement in the model of balikkal, the altar stone. A church also had the flag mast, (the dwajastambha) in front. In the Orthodox Syrian church at Chengannur, Peter and Paul occupy the place of dwarapalas, the guarding deities of a Hindu shrine. Sometimes a gateway like the temple gopuram with a kottupura or music room on the upper storey was also provided. The Marth Mariam church at Kuravilangad, originally built in 345 A.D had undergone renovations several times. The church has a rich collection of old relics including a statue of Virgin Mary and a cross carved in granite. The Knanaya Valiapally of Kaduthuruthy is another old church with the biggest cross formed in a single granite piece. The Valiapally of Piravom is also another old church with old Persian writings.

Wood carving and mural paintings, the two decorative media of temples are seen to be adopted in ancient churches also. A famous piece of wooden carving is a large panel depicting the last supper in St. Thomas church, Mulanthuruthy. The All Saints church at Udayamperur has a beam resting on wooden mouldings of heads of elephants and rhinoceros. Floral figures, angels and apostles are the usual motifs of mural paintings. This form of decoration had continued in later churches as well. In St. Sebastian's church at Kanjoor a mural even depicts the fight between British and Tippu Sultan.

Colonial influences in church architecture 

The Portuguese were the first to introduce European styles in the church architecture of Kerala, followed by Dutch and British. The first church of this type in India was built by the Franciscan missionaries in 1510 A.D. at Fort Kochi. It is a small unpretentious building of the medieval Spanish type. When Vasco De Gama died in Kochi in 1524 his body was interred in this church and later removed to Lisbon in 1538. The church thus came to be known as Vasco De Gama's church. It was later seized by the Dutch and was used for reformed services. Later with British occupation of Kochi it became an Anglican church and presently it belongs to church of south India.

The Portuguese had introduced many innovations in the Kerala churches. For the first time, the dominating tower above the altar, which was the adaptation from temple architecture, was discarded. Inside the church, the granite images were not favoured owing to their association with the Hindu art; instead images of Saints made of wood were used to adorn the riches. Generally pulpits were erected and altar pieces were ornamented in an impressive manner. Ceilings and walls were painted with religious themes in the style of European masters. Pointed and rounded arches were introduced and stained glass windows were installed.

The subsequent development in church architecture in the British period also saw the introduction of a new church design. In place of the rectangular Basilican plan the cross shaped plan became increasingly popular especially in places where large congregation had to be accommodated. Apart from the obvious symbolism of the cross, this plan is more suited for better visibility of the altar from all points in the church. Further, sufficient space was now available at the transepts for additional altars for services by several priests on important occasions like Christmas.

In the external features the central tower or rather the Roman dome now comes at the centre of the transept imparting a classic form of European architecture. Also on either side of the main entrance in the front, rose towers to serve as belfries. In the treatment of the exterior, typical features of European church architecture were introduced – the Gothic arches, the pilasters and buttresses, the rounded openings, the classic mouldings and stained glass windows making the whole composition completely different from the native architecture. Depending on the period of construction, one can also distinguish between the churches done in the simplicity of Gothic style as in the Palayam church, Tiruvananthapuram, and the luxury of renaissance style as in the church of Our Lady of Dolorous at Trissoor.

Modern trends in church architecture 

While the character of church architecture is generally identified with the form evolved in the medieval times, the modernistic trends in adapting new plan shapes and structural forms are visible in the Kerala scene as well. This circular plan shape with domical shell roof has been adopted in the Christ College church at Irinjalakkuda. The Cathedral church of Archbishop of Varapuzha at Ernakulam is a soaring hyperbolic paraboloid in reinforced concrete with a bold expression in sharp contrast with all traditional forms. Perhaps experimentation in religious architecture is mostly manifested in church architecture as compared to that in temples or mosques which more or less adhere to old evolved forms.

Jewish architecture 
The architectural scene of Kerala was influenced by many socio-cultural groups and religious thoughts from foreign lands. The sea board had promoted trade contacts with maritime nations such as Israel, Rome, Arabia and China even prior to the dawn of the Christian era. The trade contact would have paved the way of establishing settlements near the old port towns and gradually spreading in the interior. During the time of the second Chera Kingdom, the old port city of Makotai (Kodungallur) had different parts occupied by these groups. For example, the cultural contact of Jews with Kerala predates the time of Solomen and by fifteenth century there were Jewish settlements in Kodungallur, Kochi and other coastal towns. The most important Jewish settlement is seen at Kochi near the Mattancherry palace. Their residential buildings resemble the Kerala type in their external appearance; nevertheless they are of a different plan concept. The ground floor rooms are used as shops or warehouses and the living rooms are planned on the first floor. The frontage of the building about the streets and the sides are continuous with adjoining buildings in the pattern of the row houses. An important historic monument of the Jew town is the Synagogue. It is a simple tall structure with a sloping tile roof but it has a rich interior with hand painted tiles from Canton, China and ancient chandeliers from Europe. This religious structure built for worship according to Judaism stands in contrast with the temples of Hindus. Jewish community however did not influence the architecture of Kerala.

Domestic architecture 

The evolution of domestic architecture of Kerala followed closely the trend of development in temple architecture. The primitive models were huts made of bamboo frame thatched with leaves in circular, square or rectangular plain shapes. The rectangular shape with a hipped roof appears to have been finally evolved from functional consideration. Structurally the roof frame was supported on the pillars on walls erected on a plinth raised from the ground for protection against dampness and insects in the tropical climate. Often the walls were also of timbers abundantly available in the land. The roof frame consisted of the bressumer or wall plate which supported lower ends of the rafters, the upper ends being connected to the ridge. The weight of the rafters and the roof covering created a sage in the ridge when the ridge piece was made of flexible materials like bamboo. This sage however remained as the hall-mark of roof construction even when strong timber was used for the roof frame. Further gable windows were evolved at the two ends to provide attic ventilation when ceiling was incorporated for the room spaces. This ensured air circulation and thermal control for the roof. The lower ends of the rafters projected much beyond the walls to shade the walls from the sun and driving rain.

The closed form of the Kerala houses was thus gradually evolved from technical considerations. One can see the striking similarity of this form with the temple structure. The plinth, the lower most part is still called adhisthana, though it is plain or less ornate. The sthambas or pillars and bhithis or walls are again of simple shape with no projection or recesses. The main door faces only in one cardinal direction and the windows are small and are made like pierced screens of wood. The rectangular plan is usually divided into two or three activity rooms with access from a front passage. The projecting caves cover a verandah all round. By tenth century, the theory and practice of domestic architecture were codified in books such as Manushyalaya Chandrika and Vastu vidya. This attempt standardised the house construction suited to different socio-economic groups and strengthens the construction tradition among the craftsmen. The traditional craftsman, specially carpenters, preserved the knowledge by rigidly following the canonical rules of proportions of different elements as well as the construction details to this day.

Basically the domestic architecture of Kerala follows the style of detached building; row houses seen in other parts of India are neither mentioned in Kerala texts nor put up in practice except in settlements (sanketam) occupied by Tamil or Konkini Brahmans. In its most developed form the typical Kerala house is a courtyard type – nalukettu. The central courtyard is an outdoor living space which may house some object of cult worship such as a raised bed for tulsi or jasmine (mullathara). The four halls enclosing the courtyard, identical to the nalambalam of the temple, may be divided into several rooms for different activities such as cooking, dining, sleeping, studying, storage of grains etc. Depending on the size and importance of the household the building may have one or two upper storeys (malika) or further enclosed courtyard by repetition of the nalukettu to form ettukettu (eight halled building) or a cluster of such courtyards.

Nalukettu 

Nālukettu is the traditional homestead of Tharavadu where many generations of a matrilineal family lived. These types of buildings are typically found in the Indian state of Kerala. The traditional architecture is typically a rectangular structure where four blocks are joined together with a central courtyard open to the sky. The four halls on the sides are named Vadakkini (northern block), Padinjattini (western block), Kizhakkini (eastern block) and Thekkini (southern block). The architecture was especially catered to large families of the traditional tharavadu, to live under one roof and enjoy the commonly owned facilities of the marumakkathayam homestead.

Elements of Nalukettu 

 

It is a structure containing a door forming part of Compound wall for the house with a tiled roof on top. It is the formal entry to the compound with the house. At present the door is not there as car will have to enter the house through the entry. Still tiled roof is provided preferably with a traditional type lamp below the roof. Instead of door of entry, we now have the Gate

 Poomukham

It is the prime portico soon after steps to the house. Traditionally it has a slope tiled roof with pillars supporting roof. Sides are open. In the earlier days, the head of the family called Karanavar used to sit here in a reclining chair with thuppal kolambi (Spittoon) by the side of chair. This chair will have long rails on either side where the Karanavar will keep his legs raised for comfortable rest

 Chuttu verandah

From the Poomukham, a verandah to either side in front of the house through open passage called Chuttu Verandah. Chuttu verandah will have hanging lights in equal distance hanging from its slope roof.

 Charupady

By the side of Chuttu verandah and Poomukham, wooden benches with carved decorative resting wooden pieces for resting the back are provided. This is called Charupady. Traditionally the family members or visitors used to sit on these charupady to talk

 Ambal Kulam (Pond)

At the end of Chuttu verandah there used to be a small pond built with rubble on sides where lotus or Ambal used to be planted. The water bodies are maintained to synthesised energy flow inside.

 Nadumuttom

Traditionally Nadumuttom or central open courtyard is the prime center the Nalukettu. There is an open area usually square shaped in the exact middle of the house dividing the house in its four sides. Due to this four side division of the house by having a Nadumuttom. Similarly there was Ettu kettu and Pathinaru kettu which are quite rare with two and four Nadumuttom respectively

Nadumuttom will be normally open to sky, allowing sunshine and rains to pour in. This is to allow natural energies to circulate within the house and allow positive vibrance within. A thulsi or tree will be normally planted in center of Nadumuttom, which is used to worship. Architecturally the logic is allow tree to act as a natural air purifier.

 Pooja Room

Pooja room should preferably be in the North East corner of the house. Idols can be placed facing east or west and the person praying can face west or east respectively. At present, wooden panelling is done on Pooja room walls and there is a standard design for Pooja room which can be given to clients interested in having traditional Pooja room

Key features 

The whole being protected with a compound wall or fence. An entrance structure (padippura) may also be constructed like the gopuram of a temple. This may contain one or two rooms for guests or occasional visitors who are not entertained in the main house. The position and sizes of various buildings, including the location of trees and paths within the compound wall were to be decided from the analysis of the site according to the prescriptions in the classic texts. This analysis involved the concept of vastupurusha mandala wherein the site (vastu) was divided into a number of grids (padam) occupied by different deities (devatha) and appropriate grids were chosen to house the suspicious structures. The site planning and building design was done by learned vishwakarma sthapathis (master builders) who synthesised the technical matters with astrological and mystical sciences.

There are numerous buildings of the nalukettu type in different parts of Kerala, though many of them are in a poor state of maintenance. Changing socio-economic conditions have split up the joint-family system centered on the large nalukettu. The Kailasa mandiram at Kottakkal belonging to the Arya Vaidyasala is a standing example of a three-storeyed nalukettu complex. Of the best preserved examples of this type are Mattancherry palace at Kochi and the taikottaram of the Padmanabhapuram palace near Kanyakumari.

Nalukettu type buildings are also seen in many villages and towns, occupied by prominent people. The humbler buildings of the population are however smaller and simpler in form but basically derived from the nalukettu. Nalukettu is a combination of four halls along four cardinal directions, centered on the courtyard or anganam one may build any one of the four halls (Ekasala), a combination of two (Dwisala) or a complex of three (Thrisala) depending on the needs. The most commonly found type in Kerala is the Ekasala facing east or north. Being located on the western and southern sides of the anganam they are referred as western hall (padinjattini) and southern hall (thekkini) respectively.

The core unit of Ekasala consists of generally three rooms connected to a front passage. The central room is used as prayer room and grain store and the two side rooms are used as living rooms. The core unit may be raised to an upper storey with a steep stair located in the front passage. The building may also be extended horizontally on all the four sides adding alindams or side rooms for activities such as cooking, dining, additional sleeping rooms, and a front hall for receiving guests. The Chappamattam Tharavadu at Chirakkadavu is a classical example of extended Ekasala. If needed Ekasala may also be provided with ancillary buildings for cattle keeping, barn, bathing rooms near tanks, outhouse for guests, gate house etc. By such extension the building may become much larger than a Nalukettu in space, but it is still categorised as Ekasala with reference to its core unit.

Vastuvidya texts prescribe the dimensions of different house types suitable for different classes. They also give the proportional system of measurements for different parts of the building all based on the perimeter (chuttu) of the core unit. The scientific basis of this dimensional system is yet to be enquired by modern studies; however the system appears to be well founded on traditional computational methods and rigidly adhered to all sizes of buildings. All over Kerala and specially in villages where the building activity is still carried out under the control of traditional sthapathis, the system is still a living practice, though it has started disappearing under the impact of 'modern architecture'.

Types of Nalukettu 

Nalukettus can be differentiated based on structure kind as well as based on caste of its occupants.

Based on structure 

Nalukettus are primarily differentiated based on their structure. Traditionally Nalukettu has one courtyard with 4 blocks/halls constructed around it in cardinal directions. However some Nalukettus have 2 courtyards, which are known as Ettukettu (8 Blocked structure) as they have altogether 8 blocks in cardinal directions. Some super structures have 4 courtyards, which then are known as Patinarukettu (16 blocked structure).

While Nalukettus and Ettukettus are more common, Pathinarukettu are extremely rare, due to its enormous size.

Likewise Nalukettus can be differentiated based on their height and number of floors. Some Nalukettus are single-storeyed and made with wood completely. Other Nalukettus are two-storeyed or sometimes even three-storeyed and have laterite-and-clay mixture as walls.

Based on caste 
The actual terms used for Nalukettus differ based on the caste and social status of its occupants.
 For Nambudiri communities, their residences are referred as illams
 For Nairs and other feudal lords, most of the Nalukettus are referred as tharavadu
 For some of the Mappila Muslims of the older Malabar region, most of the Nalukettus were referred as tharavadu
 For Samantha Kshatriya, their residences are referred as kovilakoms and kottarams
 For Syrian Christians, their residences are referred as medas and veedus

Public structures architecture 

Unlike other parts of India as well as outside, most of the administrative functions under monarchical days were conducted within premises of palace complexes. Hence the concept of independent secular public structures and its architecture evolved towards later part of the 17th century, particularly due to the contributions made by colonial powers in Kerala.

Portuguese were the first to introduce independent office complexes which stand away from residential quarters. This was out of necessity to make warehouses and its related offices away from residential apart as safety precautions. The public architectural development in Kerala was highly influenced by the European style during seventeenth to nineteenth century. The influence of the Portuguese and Dutch was most predominant in the initial stages. A Portuguese architect Thomas Fernandez is credited with the construction of forts, warehouses and bungalows at Kochi, Kozhikode and Kannur. The projecting balconies, Gothic arches and cast-iron window grill work are a few of the features passed on to Kerala architecture by the Portuguese construction. Portuguese have commissioned more than 2000 office and warehouse complexes in Fort Cochin area, apart from several European styled castles and private residential villas.

By eighteenth century British style was being popularised in the land as a result of a large number of modern constructions directly carried out by the British rulers on the one hand and the fashion for things Western by the princely class and the rich on the other. The architectural work was guided by the officers and engineers whose knowledge of the architectural style was essentially restricted to the classic books on renaissance architects – Vitruvious, Alberti & Palladio and executed by indigenous knowledge of traditional masons and carpenters recruited for the work. In a sense it was a compromise of antique craft and neo-classical construction needs.

A notable feature of the early European work in India was a tendency to demonstrate military, political and cultural superiority of the west. The Greek and Roman antiquity was considered as the richest heritage of the west and the same was emphasised in the classic orders of pillars with triangular pediments, arches and domes for public buildings, town halls, hospitals, railway stations, colleges etc. Expression of dominance was inbuilt in Doric and Ionian columns of large dimension. At the same time the purity of classic Western style gave way to the effect of style by mixing different types of columns in all sorts of buildings. For example, Corinthian columns were used mixed with Doric order in public buildings as well as residences.

This trend was however moderated very much in Kerala owing to the limitations of materials and climate.

For the masonry work the media of Indo-European work remained the laterite and lime plastering. The potentiality of exposed laterite was explored in many cases from railway quarters to government offices (e.g. old Huzur office – Collectorate, Kozhikode). Lime plastering and finishing was transferred from the interior walls of places to the exterior of buildings also to create the superwhite buildings of marble cult. The old pan tiles were replaced by Mangalore pattern tiles and flat tiles. The roof frame of traditional type was changed to trussed roof-using King post and Queen post trusses, making it possible to span large areas.

Perhaps the adaptations of European style to the climatic needs and the synthesis with traditional style are best seen in the bungalow architecture. The comfort requirement in the hot humid climate prompted the European settlers to go in for buildings with large rooms with high ceiling with verandah all around. For upper floor rooms balconies were adopted as a necessary feature, originating from the Portuguese construction. The portico, the shaded spot for passage from one building to another was added. The solid wooden shutter of doors and windows underwent change to ribbed elements – Venetian blades – permitting air circulation and providing privacy simultaneously. By 1800 glazed panels came into vogue and semicircular fan light over doors and windows became fashionable features of domestic buildings. Brick arches, terracota pieces and exposed brick work in various bonding patterns became popular. With larger number and bigger size of windows, pediments or projections supported by ornamental brackets and column decoration for protecting the window opening from rain and sun also were introduced. Cast iron fences, stair balustrades and iron grills, made in England, were used to complete the bungalow architecture.

Excellent examples of this synthesis are seen in the Napier museum at Tiruvananthapuram, and many government bungalows. In fact many of these features were smoothly adopted by the native builders to the extent that they are considered by most as traditional elements. The works of Public Works Departments have helped to spread this type of construction all over Kerala. Further the introduction of engineering education with emphasis to the western practice of construction have promoted this trend practically displacing traditional design methods.

See also 

 Padmanabhapuram Palace
 Krishnapuram Palace

References 

Arts of Kerala
 
Kerala